Chelaethiops is a genus of cyprinid fish found in lakes and rivers of Africa.  While commonly called "sardines", they are not related to the true sardines of the family Clupeidae.  There are currently five recognized species in this genus.

Species 
 Chelaethiops bibie (Joannis, 1835) (Lake Turkana sardine)
 Chelaethiops congicus (Nichols & Griscom, 1917)
 Chelaethiops elongatus Boulenger, 1899
 Chelaethiops minutus (Boulenger, 1906)
 Chelaethiops rukwaensis (Ricardo, 1939) (Lake Rukwa Sardine)

References 

 

 

Freshwater fish genera
Taxonomy articles created by Polbot